The Jordan River or River Jordan (Nahr al-ʾUrdunn; , Nəhar hayYardēn;  Nahrāʾ Yurdnan), also known as Nahr Al-Sharieat, is a  river in the Middle East that flows roughly north to south through the Sea of Galilee (Hebrew: כנרת Kinneret, Arabic: Bohayrat Tabaraya, meaning Lake of Tiberias) and on to the Dead Sea. Jordan and the Golan Heights border the river to the east, while the West Bank and Israel lie to its west. Both Jordan and the West Bank take their names from the river.

The river holds major significance in Judaism and Christianity. According to the Bible, the Israelites crossed it into the Promised Land and Jesus of Nazareth was baptized by John the Baptist in it.

Geography
The Jordan River has an upper course from its sources to the Sea of Galilee (via the Bethsaida Valley), and a lower course south of the Sea of Galilee down to the Dead Sea. In traditional terminology, the upper course (or most of it) is commonly referred to as passing through the "Hula Valley", as opposed to "Upper Jordan Valley"; the Sea of Galilee through which the river passes is a separate entity; and the term Jordan Valley is reserved for the lower course, fed by the Yarmouk and Zarqa Rivers.

Over its upper course (fed by the Hasbani River, Banias River, Dan River, and the Iyyon Stream), the river drops rapidly in a  run to the once large and swampy Lake Hula, which is slightly above sea level. Exiting the now much-diminished lake, it goes through an even steeper drop over the  down to the Sea of Galilee, which it enters at its northern end. The Jordan deposits much of the silt it is carrying within the lake, which it leaves again near its southern tip at Degania Dam. At that point, the river is situated about 210 metres below sea level. The last  section follows what is commonly termed the "Jordan Valley", which has less gradient (the total drop is another 210 metres) so that the river meanders before entering the Dead Sea, a terminal lake about 422 metres below sea level with no outlet. Two major tributaries enter from the east during this last section: the Yarmouk River and Zarqa River.

Its section north of the Sea of Galilee is within the boundaries of Israel and forms the western boundary of the Golan Heights. South of the lake, it forms the border between the Kingdom of Jordan (to the east), and Israel (to the west).

Tributaries

The streams coming together to create the River Jordan in its upper basin are, west to east:
 Iyyon (Hebrew: עיון Iyyon), Arabic name: Ajoun stream, but دردره Dardara for the uppermost course and براغيث Bareighith or Beregeith for the rest of its course, a stream which flows from Merj 'Ayun area in southern Lebanon.
 Hasbani (Arabic: الحاصباني Hasbani, Hebrew: either שניר Snir or Hatzbani), a stream which flows from the north-western foot of Mount Hermon in Lebanon, with a flow of 118 million m3 annually.
 Dan (Arabic: اللدان Leddan or Liddan, Hebrew: דן Dan), the largest among the Jordan's upper course tributaries with c. 240-252 million cubic metres per year, about twice as much as the Hasbani or the Banias, a stream whose source is also at the base of Mount Hermon.
 Banias (Arabic: بانياس Banias, Hebrew: either Banias or חרמון Hermon), a stream arising from a spring at Banias at the foot of Mount Hermon, with a flow of 106 million m3 annually, and
Nahal Sion or Nahal Assal (Hebrew) / Wadi el-'Asl or Assal (Arabic) as its major tributary.

South of the Sea of Galilee, the Jordan River receives the waters of further tributaries, the main ones, both coming from the east (Jordan), are:
 Yarmouk, the largest tributary of the lower course of the River Jordan, which forms the border between Syria and Jordan and then Jordan and Israel
 Zarqa, the second-largest tributary of the lower Jordan River.

Smaller tributaries or "side wadis" / "side streams" in this segment are, north to south
 from the east (6–10 in total)
 Wadi al-'Arab
 Wadi Ziqlab
 Wadi al-Yabis
 Wadi Kafranja or Kufrinjah passing near Ajloun
 Wadi Rajib, the last before Wadi Zarqa
 Wadi Nimrin
 from the west
 Nahal Yavne'el
 Nahal Tavor (Tabor Stream)
 Nahal Yissakhar
 Nahal Harod
 Nahal Bezeq, on the border between Israel and the West Bank, between Mount Gilboa and the Samaria Mountains
 Wadi el Maleh from the Samaria Mountains
 Wadi al-Far'a coming from the Nablus area
 Wadi Auja (Arabic) or Nahal Yitav (Hebrew)
 Wadi Qelt coming down from the Judean mountains and passing through Jericho

Etymology
Several hypotheses for the origin of most of the river's names in modern languages (e.g., Jordan, Yarden, Urdunn), one is that it comes from Semitic 'Yard|on' 'flow down' <√ירד reflecting the river's declivity, possibly appearing also in other river names in the region such as Yarkon and  Yarmouk, or it may be related to the Egyptian loanword  'yǝʾor' ('big river',  the Nile). According to this hypothesis, "Den" might be linked to the Akkadian word dannum for "powerful".  Cognates of the word are found in Aramaic, Hebrew, Mandaic, and other Semitic languages. The first recorded use of the name appears as Yārdon in Anastasi I, an ancient Egyptian papyrus that probably dates to the time of Rameses II. Early Arab chronicles referred to the river as Al-Urdunn.

In Mandaic, the etymologically related term Yardena can refer not only to the Jordan River, but also any other body of flowing water that can be used for Mandaean baptismal rituals (masbuta).

After the Crusades, the Arabic name Nahr Al Sharieat, literally "the watering place" began to be used, and was recorded by medieval geographers such as Abu'l-Fida and Al-Dimashqi. The name was shown in various forms on most notable 19th century maps of the region, and was described by Edward Robinson in his Biblical Researches in Palestine. Although historical sources do not appear to make this distinction, it is described in some modern sources as the name for the part of the river before it flows into Lake Tiberias.

History

19th century
In the 19th century the River Jordan and the Dead Sea were explored by boat primarily by Christopher Costigan in 1835, Thomas Howard Molyneux in 1847, William Francis Lynch in 1848, and John MacGregor in 1869. The full text of W. F. Lynch's 1849 book Narrative of the United States' Expedition to the River Jordan and the Dead Sea is available online.

20th century

In 1964, Israel began operating a pumping station that diverts water from the Sea of Galilee to the National Water Carrier. Also in 1964, Jordan constructed a channel that diverted water from the Yarmouk River, a main tributary of the Jordan River, to the East Ghor Canal. Syria has also built reservoirs that catch the Yarmouk's waters. Environmentalists blame Israel, Jordan and Syria for extensive damage to the Jordan River ecosystem.

In modern times, the waters are 70% to 90% used for human purposes and the flow is greatly reduced. Because of this and the high evaporation rate of the Dead Sea, as well as industrial extraction of salts through evaporation ponds, the Dead Sea is rapidly shrinking.

Main environmental issues

Reduction of water flow
The flow rate of the Jordan River once was 1.3 billion cubic metres per year; as of 2010, just 20 to 30 million cubic metres per year flow into the Dead Sea.

Pollution
A small section of the northernmost portion of the Lower Jordan, the first ca.  below the Sea of Galilee, has been kept pristine for baptism and local tourism. Most polluted is the 100-kilometre downstream stretch—a meandering stream from above the confluence with the Yarmouk to the Dead Sea. Environmentalists say the practice of letting sewage and brackish water flow into the river has almost destroyed its ecosystem. Rescuing the Jordan could take decades, according to environmentalists. In 2007, FoEME named the Jordan River as one of the world's 100 most endangered ecological sites, due in part to lack of cooperation between Israel and neighboring Arab states.

Roads, border crossings, bridges

Roads
Route 90, part of which is named after Rehavam Zeevi, connects the northern and southern tips of the Israeli-occupied West Bank and parallels the Jordan River on the western side.

Border crossings (open bridges)
There are two border crossings between Israel and Jordan which cross the river over bridges. The northern one, Jordan River Crossing or Sheikh Hussein Bridge is near Beit She'an; the southern one, Allenby Bridge (also King Hussein Bridge), is near Jericho.

Bridges (historical; modern - open and closed)
North to south:
 Daughters of Jacob Bridge (Hebrew: Gesher Bnot Ya'akov, "Daughters of Jacob Bridge") is the most famous one within Israel
 Arik Bridge at the northern end of the Sea of Galilee; allows access to the central Golan Heights, was crucial in the 1967 and 1973 wars
 Al-Sinnabra, at the spot where the river used to exit the Sea of Galilee in the past; few remains excavated by archaeologists
 Jisr el-Majami' north of Beit She'an/Beisan; closed
 Damiya or Adam Bridge halfway between Jericho and Beit She'an; closed
 King Abdullah Bridge south of the Allenby Bridge; closed.

Importance as a water source

Until the first decade of the 21st century, the waters of the Jordan River had been the largest water resource for Israel; lately, desalinated sea water from the Mediterranean has taken over this role. Israel's National Water Carrier, completed in 1964, has delivered water from the Sea of Galilee to the Israeli coastal plain for over four decades, until prolonged drought led to abandoning this solution in favour of desalination.

Jordan receives  of water from the river, a quantity which is regulated by the 1994 peace treaty with Israel. In the past, one of the main water resources in Jordan was the Jordan River, with a flow of 1.3 billion m3 per year (BCM/yr). However, after Israel built the National Water Carrier in 1953 and diverted water from Lake Tiberias to Israel's coastal plains and southern desert, the flow of the Lower Jordan River dropped significantly. The 50 MCM/yr that Israel provides from Lake Tiberias as part of the 1994 peace treaty was meant to compensate for this loss. A 2010 study found that the Lower Jordan River has been reduced to 2% of its historic flow. Water quality has also deteriorated sharply, with high levels of salinity and pollution from agricultural fertilizer and untreated wastewater upstream in Israel and the West Bank.

Conflict about the waters of the Jordan River was a contributing factor to the Six-Day War when, starting in 1965, Syria attempted to divert some of its headwaters in collaboration with Lebanon and Jordan. The diversion works would have reduced the water availability for Israel's carrier by about 35%, and Israel's overall water supply by about 11%.

Religious significance

Hebrew Bible

In the Hebrew Bible the Jordan is referred to as the source of fertility of a large plain ("Kikkar ha-Yarden"), said to be watered like "the garden of the LORD" (Genesis ). There is no regular description of the Jordan in the Bible; only scattered and indefinite references to it are given. Jacob crossed it and its tributary, the Jabbok (the modern Al-Zarqa), on his way back from Haran. It is noted as the line of demarcation between the "two tribes and the half tribe" settled to the east (Numbers ) and the "nine tribes and the half tribe of Manasseh" that, led by Joshua, settled to the west (passim).

Opposite Jericho, it was called "the Jordan of Jericho". The Jordan has a number of fords, and one of them is famous as the place where many Ephraimites were slain by Jephthah (Judges ). It seems that these are the same fords mentioned as being near Beth-barah, where Gideon lay in wait for the Midianites. In the plain of the Jordan, between Succoth and Zarthan, is the clay ground where Solomon had his brass-foundries (1 Kings ). In  the Jordan valley is portrayed as a woodland region. Biblical commentator Albert Barnes suggested that "trees were rare in most parts of Palestine, but plentiful in the Jordan Valley".

In biblical history, the Jordan appears as the scene of several miracles, the first taking place when the Jordan, near Jericho, was crossed by the Israelites under Joshua. Later the two tribes and the half tribe that settled east of the Jordan built a large altar on its banks as "a witness" between them and the other tribes (et seq.). The Jordan was crossed by Elijah and Elisha on dry ground. The prophet and wonder-worker Elisha performed two miracles at the Jordan: he healed Naaman's leprosy by having him bathe in its waters, and he made an axe head lost by one of the "children of the prophets" float, by throwing a piece of wood into the water.

Yom HaAliyah (Aliyah Day) is an Israeli national holiday celebrated annually on the tenth of the Hebrew month of Nisan to commemorate the Israelites crossing the Jordan River into the Land of Israel while carrying the Ark of the Covenant as recorded in the Hebrew Bible's Book of Joshua.

New Testament

The New Testament states that John the Baptist baptised unto repentance in the Jordan (Matthew 3:5–6; Mark; Luke ; John). These acts of Baptism are also reported as having taken place at Bethabara.

Jesus came to be baptised by him there (Matthew 3:13; ;). The Jordan is also where John the Baptist bore record of Jesus as the Son of God and Lamb of God.

The New Testament speaks several times about Jesus crossing the Jordan during his ministry, and of believers crossing the Jordan to come hear him preach and to be healed of their diseases. When his enemies sought to capture him, Jesus took refuge at the river in the place John had first baptised.

Scholars have concluded that the site called Al-Maghtas on the east side has long been considered the location for the Baptism of Jesus and a place of pilgrimage. This has led to choosing Al-Maghtas as a UNESCO World Heritage site, which took place in 2015.

Derived cultural significance

Symbolism
Because, according to Jewish tradition, the Israelites made a difficult and hazardous journey from slavery in Egypt to freedom in the Promised Land, the Jordan can refer to freedom. The actual crossing is the final step of the journey, which is then complete.

Among many other references, the Jordan River is given this meaning in the text of Old Man River: "Let me go 'way from the Mississippi / Let me go 'way from the white man boss / Show me that stream called the River Jordan / That's the old stream that I long to cross".

Christening of royals
Because of the baptism of Jesus, water from the Jordan is employed for the christening of heirs and princes in several Christian royal houses, such as the cases of Prince George of Wales, Simeon of Bulgaria and James Ogilvy. Earlier, On 15 May 1717, the Empress Maria Theresa was baptised in Vienna by the Papal Nuntius Giorgio Spinola, representing Pope Clement XI, with baptismal water containing a few drops from the River Jordan.

Christian poetry and music
The Jordan is a frequent symbol in folk, gospel, and spiritual music, and in poetic and literary works.

The baptism of Jesus is referred to in a hymn by the reformer Martin Luther, "" (1541), base for a cantata by Johann Sebastian Bach,  (1724).

The Jordan River, due primarily to its rich spiritual importance, has provided inspiration for countless songs, hymns, and stories, including the traditional African-American spiritual/folk songs "Michael Row the Boat Ashore", "Deep River", and "Roll, Jordan, Roll". It is mentioned in the songs "Eve of Destruction", "Will You Be There", and "The Wayfaring Stranger" and in "Ol' Man River" from the musical Show Boat. "The Far Side Banks of Jordan" by Johnny Cash and June Carter Cash on June's Grammy Award-winning studio album, Press On, mentions the Jordan River as well as the Promised Land. Jordan River is also the subject of roots reggae artist Burning Spear's song of the same title. Belarusian band Spasenie dedicated its whole album “Crossing the Jordan” to the topic.

See also
 Ænon
 Ed-Dikke synagogue
 Fair river sharing
 Island of Peace
 Jordan Rift Valley
 List of rivers of Israel
 List of rivers of Jordan
 Mandaeans
 Naharayim

References

Citations

Works cited

External links
 SMART – Multilateral project for sustainable water management in the lower Jordan Valley
 Inventory of Conflict and Environment (ICE), Jordan River Dispute
 "Map of the River Jordan and Dead Sea: And the Route of the Party Under the Command of Lieutenant W.F. Lynch, United States Navy" is a map from the mid-19th century of the River Jordan and Dead Sea, made under the command of William F. Lynch.
 "The Jordan River" in which John the Baptist baptized his cousin Jesus of Nazareth. (Yardenit.com)

 
International rivers of Asia
Rivers of Israel
Rivers of Jordan
Rivers of the State of Palestine
Rivers of Syria
Rivers of the West Bank
Geography of Israel
Geography of Palestine (region)
Geography of the State of Palestine
Geography of Syria
Geography of the West Bank
Landforms of the Middle East
Landforms of Western Asia
Great Rift Valley
Hebrew Bible rivers
Sacred rivers
New Testament geography
Catholic pilgrimage sites
Environmental issues in Israel
Tourism in Jordan
Border rivers
Borders of the West Bank
Israel–Jordan border
Israel–Syria border
Israel–Jordan relations
Rivers in Mandaeism